Upper Barron is a rural locality in the Tablelands Region, Queensland, Australia.

History 
Upper Barron State School opened on 31 January 1911. It was mothballed on 31 December 2008 as there were only nine students.  It closed on 31 December 2009. It was at 9570 Kennedy Highway. The school's website was archived.

References 

Tablelands Region
Localities in Queensland